Guns in the Ghetto is a studio album by UB40. It was released in 1997 on the DEP International label.

Critical reception
NME wrote that the band "play reggae with the edges filed off, made anodyne and palatable for people who aren't that interested in music any more." The New Rolling Stone Album Guide wrote that the album "has good instincts and solid playing but generally weak material."

Track listing
All tracks composed by UB40
"Always There"
"Hurry Come Up"
"I Love It When You Smile"
"I've Been Missing You"
"Oracabessa Moonshine"
"Guns in the Ghetto"
"Tell Me Is It True"
"Friendly Fire"
"I Really Can't Say"
"Lisa"

Charts

References

1997 albums
UB40 albums